Francis Rasolofonirina is a Malagasy-born Mauritian football player.

Career statistics

International

Statistics accurate as of match played 28 March 2017

International goals

References

External links 
 

Living people
Mauritius international footballers
Mauritian footballers
Mauritian Premier League players
Petite Rivière Noire FC players
1986 births
People from Toliara
Mauritian people of Malagasy descent
Sportspeople of Malagasy descent
Association football defenders